The British Academy Television Craft Award for Best Titles & Graphic Identity is one of the categories presented by the British Academy of Film and Television Arts (BAFTA) within the British Academy Television Craft Awards, the craft awards were established in 2000 with their own, separate ceremony as a way to spotlight technical achievements, without being overshadowed by the main production categories. According to the BAFTA website, this category is "to recognise originality and excellence within the title sequence and graphic identity of a programme.", also stating that "the same title sequence may not be entered more than once. The same programme may be entered in consecutive years, but only if it has new titles."

The category was gone through some name changes since its creation:
 From 1978 to 1993 it was presented as Best Graphics.
 From 1994 to 2000 and then from 2003 to 2005 it was presented as Best Graphic Design.
 In 2001, 2002 and 2013 it was awarded with the Best Special, Visual & Graphic Effects category under the name Best Visual Effects and Graphic Design.
 From 2006 to 2015 it was presented as Best Titles, with the exception of 2011, 2012 and 2014 where it was not awarded.
 Since 2016, the category is presented as Best Titles and Graphic Identity.

Winners and nominees

1970s
Best Graphics

1980s
Best Graphics

1990s
Best Graphics

Best Graphic Design

2000s
Best Graphic Design

Best Titles

2010s
Best Titles

Best Titles & Graphic Identity

2020s

See also
 Primetime Emmy Award for Outstanding Main Title Design

References

External links
 

Titles & Graphic Identity